Saint Paul of Latrus (or Paul of Latra; died ) was a Greek hermit.
His feast day is 20 December.

Life
Saint Paul of Latrus spent most of his religious life as a hermit on Mount Latrus near the city of Miletus in Caria (now western Turkey). He later founded a monastery on Mount Latrus.

He generally avoided the powerful and preferred the company of humble people, but he received letters from Tsar Peter I of Bulgaria, and wrote to the emperor urging the removal of Manichaeans from the territories of Kibyrrhaeotis and Miletus. A large number of disciples gathered around him, and to avoid them he moved to the island of Samos.

He died in 955 or 956.

Monks of Ramsgate account
The monks of St Augustine's Abbey, Ramsgate, wrote in their Book of Saints (1921),

Nikephoros the Monk
Paul of Latrus was mentioned in Nikephoros the Monk's work On Watchfulness and the Guarding of the Heart, which was later included in the Philokalia. He mentions that:

Butler's account
The hagiographer Alban Butler (1710–1773) wrote in his Lives of the Fathers, Martyrs, and Other Principal Saints, under July 1,

Notes

Sources

 

 

Saints of medieval Greece
956 deaths
Greek hermits
10th-century Byzantine monks
Byzantine saints of the Eastern Orthodox Church